David Karp (born 1986) is the founder of Tumblr.

David or Dave Karp may also refer to:

David Karp (novelist) (1922–1999), American novelist and television writer, who also used the pseudonyms Wallace Ware and Adam Singer
David Karp (pomologist) (born 1958), American culinary journalist
David A. Karp (born 1944), American sociologist
Dave Karp, a character in the 1992 film The Mighty Ducks